The following units and commanders fought in the Battle of Breitenfeld of the Thirty Years War in 1631.  Unless otherwise noted, all units have ten companies.

Holy Roman Empire (Catholic)
Johann Tserclaes, Count of Tilly
Unless otherwise noted, all units are German.

Left
General Gottfried Heinrich Graf zu Pappenheim
 Bernstein Imperial Cuirassier (Veteran) - Colonel Wilhelm von Bernstein
 Merode-Waroux Imperial Cuirassier - Colonel Jean de Merode-Waroux (Walloon)
 Neusächsisch Imperial Cuirassier - Colonel Franz Albecht von Saxe-Lauenburg
 Piccolomini Imperial Cuirassier (Veteran) - General Ottavio Piccolomini
 Rangoni Imperial Cuirassier - Colonel Giulio Marchese Rangoni
 Strozzi Imperial Cuirassier (Veteran) - Colonel Giacomo Strozzi
 Trèka Imperial Cuirassier - Colonel Adam Erdmann Trèka von Lippa

Center
Gen. Otto Friedrich von Schönburg
 Baldiron-Dietrichstein Imperial Infantry - Colonel Antoni von Baldiron-Dietrichstein
 Blankart League Infantry - Colonel Otto Ludwig von Blankart
 Caffarelli Imperial Arquebusier (5 companies) - Colonel Francesco de Caffarelli (Walloon)
 Chiesa Imperial Infantry - Colonel Kaspar Francesco Chiesa
 Colloredo Imperial Arquebusier - Colonel Giovanni Battista von Colloredo
 Comargo-Reinach League Infantry - Colonel Hans Ludwig von Grotta
 Contreras Imperial Infantry - Gen. Alonso Guillén de Contreras
 Coronini Imperial Arquebusier - Colonel Johann P. Coronini von Cronberg
 Erwitte League Cuirassier - Gen. Dietrich Ottmar von Erwitte
 Fürstenberg Imperial Infantry - Colonel Egon von Fürstenberg-Heiligenberg
 Gallas Imperial Infantry (Veteran) - Gen. Matthias Gallas
 Gonzaga Imperial Infantry - Colonel Hannibal M. von Gonzaga
 Geleen League Infantry (Veteran) - Colonel Gottfried Huyn von Geleen
 Göss Imperial Infantry - Colonel Max von Liechtenstein
 Hareaucourt Imperial Arquebusier Squadron (5 companies) - Colonel Henri Haraucourt de Faulquemont (Walloon)
 Holstein-Gottorp Imperial Infantry - Colonel Adolf von Holstein-Gottorp
 Montecuccoli Imperial Arquebusier - Colonel Ernesto Montecuccoli
 Pappenheim Imperial Infantry - Colonel Philipp von Pappenheim
 Savelli League Infantry (Veteran) - Colonel Federigo di Savelli
 Tilly League Infantry (Veteran) - Johann Tserclaes, Count of Tilly
 Wahl League Infantry - Colonel Joachim Christian von Wahl
 Wangler Imperial Infantry (Veteran) - Colonel Johann von Wangler "the Elder"

Right
General Count Egon VIII of Fürstenberg-Heiligenberg 
 Altsächsisch Imperial Cuirassier - Colonel Julius Henry of Saxe-Lauenburg
 Baumgarten League Cuirassier - Colonel Wilhelm von Baumgarten (Italian)
 Cronberg League Cuirassier (Veteran) - Colonel Adam Philip von Cronberg (Walloon)
 Schönburg League Cuirassier (Veteran) - Gen. Otto Friedrich von Schönburg
 Wengersky Imperial Cuirassier (10 companies + dragoon detachment) - Colonel Albrecht Wengersky

Skirmishers
 Isolano Irregular Light Horse - Colonel Johann Ludwig Hektor Isolano (Croatian and Hungarian)
 Independent Dragoon companies

Artillery
 Siege Pieces
 10 demi-cannon
 Field Pieces
 16 quarter cannon
 7 Saxon quarter cannon (captured at Prague)

Swedish-Saxon

Saxon forces
Prince John George I, Elector of Saxony

Left
General Hans Rudolf von Bindauf
 Bindauf Cuirassier Regiment (Raw)  (8 companies) - Gen. Hans Rudolf von Bindauf
 Anhalt Cuirassier Squadron (Raw) (5 companies) - Colonel Ernst von Anhalt-Bernburg
 Kurfürstin Hovfanna Independent Cuirassier Company (Raw)
 Hofkirchen Cuirassier Squadron (Raw) (5 companies) - Colonel Lorenz Hofkirchen
 Löser "Feudal Levy" Cuirasser Squadron (Raw) (6 companies) - Colonel Hans von Löser
 Saxe-Altenburg Cuirasser Regiment (Raw) (8 companies) - Johann Philipp von Saxe-Altenburg 
 Pflugk "Feudal Levy" Cuirassier Regiment (Raw) (6 companies) - Colonel Bernhard von Pflugk

Center
Friedrich Wilhelm II, Duke of Saxe-Altenburg
 Arnim Infantry Regiment (Militia) - Marshal Hans Georg von Arnim-Boitzenburg
 Independent Free (Detached Musketeer) Companies (3 companies)
 Klitzing Infantry Regiment (Militia) - Colonel Hans Kaspar von Klitzing
 Löser Infantry Regiment (Militia) - Colonel Hans von Löser
 Starschedel Infantry Regiment (Raw) - Colonel Moritz Dietrich von Starschedel
 Volfersdorf Household Foot Regiment - Colonel Siegmund von Wolfersdorf
 Bose Household Foot Regiment (8 companies) - Colonel Karl von Bose
 Kurfürst Infantry (Detached Musketeer) Companies (3 companies) - Colonel Johann Casimir von Schaumberg
 Pforte Household Foot Regiment (8 companies) - Colonel Johann von der Pforte
 Vitzthum Household Foot Regiment (8 companies) - Dam Vitzthum

Right
Marshal Hans Georg von Arnim-Boitzenburg
 Arnim Leibgarde Cuirassier Regiment (Veteran) (2 companies) - Marshal Hans George von Arnim-Boitzenburg
 Kurfürstin Cuirassier Regiment (Militia) (5 companies) - Colonel von Taube
 Steinau Cuirassier Regiment (Militia) (3 companies) - Colonel Wolf Adam von Steinau
 Kalckstein Cuirassier Regiment (Militia) - Colonel Albrecht von Kalckstein
 Wilhelm Leib Cuirassier Squadron (Militia) (5 companies) - Colonel Wilhelm Leib
 Saxe-Altenburg Cuirassier Regiment (Militia) - Friedrich Wilhelm II, Duke of Saxe-Altenburg

Artillery
 Siege Pieces
 12 quarter cannon

Swedish forces
Gustavus Adolphus of Sweden

Left
Marshal Gustav Karlsson Horn
 Horn Cuirassier Regiment (8 companies) - Marshal Gustav Horn (German)
 Baudissin Cuirassier Regiment (12 companies) - Gen. Wolf Heinrich von Baudissin (German)
 Caldenbach Cuirassier Regiment (8 companies) - Colonel Moritz Pensen von Caldenbach (German)
 Courville Cuirassier Squadron (5 companies) - Colonel Nicholas de Courville (German)
 Hall Cuirassier Regiment (12 companies) - Colonel Adolf Theodor von Efferen-Hall
 Waldstein Infantry Regiment (8 companies) - Colonel Berthold von Waldstein (German)

Right
General Sir Johan Banér
 "Commanded" Musketeer Reserve (8 companies) - Gen. Johann Banér
 Rosen Infantry Regiment (12 companies) - Colonel Reinhold von Rosen (German)
 Finnish (Light) Horsemen (Veteran) (12 companies) - Gen. Åke Henriksson Tott (Finnish)
 Östergötland Horsemen (Veteran) (4 companies) - Colonel Claus Dietrich von Sperreuth (Swedish)
 Småland Horsemen (Veteran) (8 companies) - Fredrik Stenbock (Swedish)
 Västergötland Horsemen (Veteran) (8 companies) - Colonel Erik Soop (Swedish)
 Dāmitz Cuirassier Regiment (4 companies) - Colonel Sigfrid von Dāmitz (German)
 Courland Cuirassier Squadron (4 companies) - Colonel Ernst Dönhoff (Latvian)
 Livonia Cuirassier Regiment (5 companies) - Lieutenant Colonel Jürgen Aderkas (Estonian)
 Rheingreven Cuirassier Regiment (Veteran) (15 companies) - Otto Ludwig von Salm-Kyrburgh (German)
 1st Squadron (Veteran) (4 companies) - Lieutenant Colonel Torsten Stålhandske (Swedish)
 2nd Squadron (Veteran) (4 companies) - Colonel Reinhold Wunsch (Swedish)

Center
General Maximilian Teuffel
 "Yellow" Brigade - Gen. Maximilian Teuffel (Swedish and German)
 "Yellow" (Gula) Infantry Regiment (12 companies) - Gen. Maximilian Teuffel (Swedish and German)
 Chemnitz Infantry Squadron (4 companies) - Colonel Niklas von Chemnitz (German)
Oxenstierna's Brigade - Colonel Åke Gustafsson Oxenstierna
 Dalarna (Dalregementet) Infantry Regiment (Veteran) (7 companies) - Colonel Åke Gustafsson Oxenstierna (Swedish)
 Uppland, Närke, and Värmland Infantry Regiment (Veteran) (8 companies) - Lieutenant Colonel Axel Gustavsson Lillie (Swedish)
 Finnish Infantry Regiment (Veteran) (8 companies) - Colonel Klas Hastfer (Swedish)
 Hand's Brigade - Colonel Erik Hand
 Östergötland Infantry Regiment (8 companies) - Colonel Erik Hand (Swedish)
 Dalsland Infantry Squadron (4 companies) - Colonel Wilhelm von Salzburg (Swedish)
 Västergötland Infantry Regiment (8 companies) - Colonel Karl Hård af Segerstad (Swedish)
 "Blue" Brigade - Gen. Hans Georg aus dem Winckel (German)
 "Blue" Infantry Regiment (12 companies) - Gen. Hans Georg aus dem Winckel (German)
 "Red" Infantry Regiment (12 companies) - Colonel Giesebrecht von Hegendorf (German)
 Scots Brigade - Colonel James Lumsdaine
 Lumsdaine Infantry Regiment (Veteran) (8 companies) - Colonel James Lumsdaine (Scottish)
 Mackay/Monro Infantry Regiment (Veteran) (8 companies) - Colonel Donald Mackay and Robert Monro (Scottish)
 Ramsey Infantry Regiment (Veteran) (8 companies) - Colonel Sir James Ramsay (Scottish)
 Hamilton Infantry Regiment (Veteran) (8 companies) - Colonel Sir John Hamilton (Scottish)
 Ortenburg Cuirassier Regiment (The King's "Life Regiment of Horse") - Colonel Johann Philip von Ortenburg (Latvian)

Center (Reserve)
General John Hepburn
 "Green" Brigade - Gen. John Hepburn (Scottish)
 "Green" (Gröna) Infantry Regiment (8 companies) - Gen. John Hepburn (German)
 Foulis Scottish Infantry Regiment (8 companies) - Lieutenant Colonel Robert Munro, 18th Baron of Foulis (Scottish)
 Bock Musketeer Regiment (8 companies) - Colonel von Bock (German)
 Von Thurn's Brigade - General Heinrich Mathias von Thurn
 "Black" Infantry Regiment (Veteran) (8 companies) - Gen. Heinrich Mathias von Thurn (German)
 "Black" Infantry Regiment (8 companies) - Colonel Adolf Theodor von Efferen-Hall (German) 
 "White" Infantry Regiment (12 companies) - Colonel Sigfrid von Dārgitz (German)
 Vitzthum's Brigade - Colonel Johann Vitzthum von Ecksådt
 "Orange" Infantry Regiment (8 companies) - Colonel Johann Vitzthum von Ecksådt (German) 
 Mitschefall Infantry Squadron (5 companies) - Colonel Wilhelm Kasper von Mitschefall (German) 
 John Ruthwenn Infantry Regiment (8 companies) - Lieutenant Colonel John Ruthwenn (German)
 Schaffman Cuirassier Squadron (4 companies) - Colonel Adam Schaffman (Czech/Silesian)
 Kochtitzky Horse (4 companies) - Colonel Andras Kochtitzky "the Younger" (Slav/Pomeranian)
 Taupadel Dragoon Squadron (4 companies) - Colonel Georg Christof von Taupadel (Train Guard)

Artillery
 Field Pieces - Colonel Lennart Torstensson
 12 quarter cannons (3 ahead of each front line brigade)
 "Regimental" pieces
 42 minions

References
 Higgins, Dave. "Breitenfeld: Regiment versus Tercio." Strategy & Tactics, Number 235 (June 2006). ISSN 1040-886X

Thirty Years' War orders of battle